Everybody's Old Man is a 1936 American drama film directed by James Flood and written by Patterson McNutt and A.E. Thomas. The film stars Irvin S. Cobb, Rochelle Hudson, Johnny Downs, Norman Foster, Alan Dinehart, Sara Haden, Donald Meek and Warren Hymer. The film was released on March 20, 1936, by 20th Century Fox.

Plot

Cast 
Irvin S. Cobb as William Franklin
Rochelle Hudson as Cynthia Sampson
Johnny Downs as Tommy Sampson
Norman Foster as Ronald Franklin
Alan Dinehart as Frederick Gillespie
Sara Haden as Susan Franklin
Donald Meek as Finney
Warren Hymer as Mike Murphy
Maurice Cass as Dr. Phillips
Charles Coleman as Mansfield
Ramsay Hill as Earl of Spearford
John Miltern as Larson
Walter Walker as Haslett
Frederick Burton as Aylesworth
Hal K. Dawson as Jameson
Delma Byron as Miss Martin 
Hilda Vaughn as Maid
Dan White (actor) (uncredited)

References

External links
 

1936 films
1930s English-language films
American drama films
1936 drama films
20th Century Fox films
Films directed by James Flood
American black-and-white films
1930s American films